is a video game composer and pianist. She composed music for Sega games, and was best known for her work on the Panzer Dragoon series.

Works

References

External links
 

Year of birth missing (living people)
21st-century Japanese pianists
Japanese composers
Japanese women composers
Japanese pianists
Japanese women pianists
Living people
Musicians from Yokohama
Sega people
Video game composers
21st-century Japanese women musicians
21st-century women pianists